The 2020–21 FC Viktoria Plzeň season was the club's 28th season in the Czech First League. The team competed in Czech First League, the Czech Cup, the UEFA Champions League and the UEFA Europa League.

First team squad
.

Out on loan

Kits

Coaching staff

Transfers

In

Out

New contracts

Pre-season and friendlies

Competitions

Czech First League

League table

Results summary

Results by round

Matches

Czech Cup

UEFA Champions League

Qualifying rounds

UEFA Europa League

Qualifying rounds

Squad statistics

Appearances and goals

Goal scorers

Assists

Clean sheets

References

External links
Official website

Viktoria Plzeň
FC Viktoria Plzeň seasons
Viktoria Plzeň